Lucas Abraham Chaves (born 9 August 1995) is an Argentine professional footballer who plays as a goalkeeper for Argentine Primera División side Huracán.

Career
Prior to starting his professional career with Argentinos Juniors, he spent time with the youth teams. He first appeared in the Argentinos first-team in 2016 when he was an unused substitute for the Argentine Primera División matches against Huracán, San Martín, Newell's Old Boys, Racing Club and Vélez Sarsfield. He made his professional debut on 5 June 2017 in Primera B Nacional versus Boca Unidos. Four months later, Chaves made his top-flight debut in a draw with River Plate.

Career statistics
.

Honours
Argentinos Juniors
Primera B Nacional: 2016–17

References

External links

 Lucas Chaves at FOXsports
 Lucas Chaves at yahoo!sports

1995 births
Living people
People from Tres de Febrero Partido
Argentine footballers
Association football goalkeepers
Primera Nacional players
Argentine Primera División players
Argentinos Juniors footballers
Sportspeople from Buenos Aires Province